Events from the year 1700 in Russia

Incumbents
 Monarch – Peter I

Events

 13 July - Treaty of Constantinople, Russian tsardom relieved from paying the annual tribute to the Crimean Khanate paid since the occupation of Muscovy by the Golden Horde.
30 November - Battle of Narva, an early battle in the Great Northern War where a Russian siege force was defeated by a Swedish relief army under Charles XII of Sweden.

Births

 Anastasija Trubetskaya, courtier (died 1755)

Deaths

References

 
Years of the 17th century in Russia